Gajedi is a village development committee in Rupandehi District in Lumbini Province of southern Nepal. At the time of the 1991 Nepal census it had a population of 7751 people living in 1310 individual households. This place is near Lumbini, birthplace of Gautam Budhha. It is also known for being the location of scenic attraction Gajedi Lake.

References

Populated places in Rupandehi District